John William Rainford (11 December 1930 – 21 May 2001) was an English professional footballer who played as an inside forward. He is best remembered for his 9 years in the Football League with Brentford, for whom he made over 320 appearances. He was posthumously inducted into the Brentford Hall of Fame in 2015.

Club career

Crystal Palace 
Born in Camden Town, Rainford began his career at Third Division South club Crystal Palace and signed his first professional contract in March 1949. Despite making his professional debut late in the 1948–49 season, he had a slow start to his Selhurst Park career and failed to appear at all during the following season and made just one league appearance in 1950–51. Rainford broke into the team during the 1951–52 season and made 34 league appearances and scored his first goal for the club. He scored seven goals in 28 appearances in the following season and departed in May 1953. Rainford made 67 appearances and scored 10 goals for the Eagles.

Cardiff City 
Rainford moved up to the First Division to join Cardiff City in a £3,000 deal in May 1953. He lasted only a matter of months at Ninian Park and scored one goal in three appearances before departing in October 1953.

Brentford 
Rainford dropped down to the Second Division to sign for Brentford in October 1953 and was new manager Bill Dodgin's first signing for the club. He quickly established himself in the team and made 32 appearances during a disastrous 1953–54 season, which saw the Bees relegated to the Third Division South. Despite averaging just under 30 games a season, Rainford's career at Griffin Park didn't take off until the arrival of Malcolm McDonald as manager in May 1957. Playing at inside forward, he provided many assists for prolific strikers George Francis and Jim Towers and set a new club record for consecutive appearances, when he played 135 matches in a row between November 1957 and September 1960.

For his service to the club, Rainford was given a testimonial in May 1961, which he shared with Ken Coote. Rainford's final season was the 1961–62 campaign and he departed prior to the club's relegation to the Fourth Division in May 1962. He made 324 appearances and scored 49 goals during just shy of 9 years at Griffin Park. Rainford received a second testimonial in 1986 and shared the £1,100 proceeds with Jim Towers.

Tonbridge 
Rainford ended his career in non-league football with Southern League club Tonbridge, whom he joined on a free transfer late in the 1961–62 season.

Representative career 
Rainford appeared for the Third Division South representative team in a match against their northern counterparts on 16 March 1955. In a televised game, he scored the opening goal in a 2–0 win for the South.

Honours 
 Brentford Hall of Fame

Career statistics

References

1930 births
2001 deaths
English footballers
Crystal Palace F.C. players
Cardiff City F.C. players
Brentford F.C. players
Tonbridge Angels F.C. players
English Football League players
Southern Football League players
Association football inside forwards